Pirelli Star Driver was an initiative to support young rally drivers, organised by Pirelli and the Fédération Internationale de l'Automobile (FIA).

History
For the first two years of the scheme, 2009 and 2010, five drivers were selected from four FIA Championships, one from the African Rally Championship, one from the Asia-Pacific Rally Championship, two from the European Rally Championship and one from the Middle East Rally Championship. The driver selection process was conducted by each individual FIA region.

The five drivers then competed in six events of the World Rally Championship, driving in identical Mitsubishi Lancer Evolution X, prepared by Ralliart Italy.

The scheme was changed for the 2011 season. 16 drivers were nominated for a global shootout, from which six drivers were selected. They will compete in the new WRC Academy in Ford Fiesta R2s.

Drivers

WRC results

WRC Academy Results

See also
Drive DMACK Fiesta Trophy

References

World Rally Championship
Pirelli
World Rally Championship teams